The 2015 Sriwijaya season  is the 10th season in the club's football history, the 10th consecutive season in the top-flight Liga Indonesia season and the 7th season competing in the Indonesia Super League.

Review and events

Pre–2015 
On 1 December, Sriwijaya announced that Benny Dollo had been appointed as the new manager for the 2015 season.

Matches

Legend

Friendlies

Indonesia Super League

Statistics

Squad 
.

|}

Transfers

In

Out

Sources

External links 
 Sriwijaya season at ligaindonesia.co.id 
 2015 Sriwijaya season at sriwijaya-fc.com 

Sriwijaya F.C.
Sriwijaya